The  was the fourth season of the nationwide fourth tier of Japanese football, and the 19th season since the establishment of Japan Football League.

Clubs
Sixteen clubs participated in this season of Japan Football League. The list was announced on 16 January 2017.

League table

Season statistics

Top scorers
.

Attendances

Promotion from Regional Leagues
Cobaltore Onagawa and Tegevajaro Miyazaki

References

Japan Football League seasons
3